Lukas Reiff Lerager (born 12 July 1993) is a Danish professional footballer who plays as a midfielder for Danish club Copenhagen.

Club career
Lerager played club football for AB, Viborg and Zulte Waregem.

He joined French club Bordeaux in June 2017, signing a four-year contract.

On 29 January 2019, Lerager signed to Italian Serie A club Genoa on loan with an option to buy. The deal was later turned permanent.

He moved on loan to F.C. Copenhagen on 1 February 2021. The transfer was made permanent on 21 May 2022.

International career
After representing them at youth level, Lerager made his debut for the Denmark senior national team in 2017.

In June 2018 he was named in Denmark's 23-man squad for the 2018 FIFA World Cup in Russia.

Career statistics

Club

International

Scores and results list Denmark's goal tally first, score column indicates score after each Lerager goal.

Honours
Viborg
 Danish 1st Division: 2014–15

Zulte Waregem
 Belgian Cup: 2016–17

Copenhagen
 Danish Superliga: 2021–22

References

1993 births
Living people
Association football midfielders
Danish men's footballers
Danish expatriate men's footballers
People from Gladsaxe Municipality
Denmark youth international footballers
Denmark under-21 international footballers
Denmark international footballers
Akademisk Boldklub players
Viborg FF players
S.V. Zulte Waregem players
FC Girondins de Bordeaux players
Genoa C.F.C. players
F.C. Copenhagen players
Danish 1st Division players
Danish Superliga players
Belgian Pro League players
Ligue 1 players
Serie A players
2018 FIFA World Cup players
Danish expatriate sportspeople in Belgium
Danish expatriate sportspeople in France
Danish expatriate sportspeople in Italy
Expatriate footballers in Belgium
Expatriate footballers in Italy
Expatriate footballers in France
Sportspeople from the Capital Region of Denmark